The Greater Warangal Municipal Corporation (abbreviated: GWMC) is the civic body of Warangal. Its geographical area covers most of that administered by the Kakatiya Urban Development Authority.

History
Warangal Municipality being one of the oldest in the state was a major municipality in 1844 Fasli. In July 1959 it was upgraded as a special grade municipality, in July 1960 into a selection grade, and then on 18 August 1994 it was declared as municipal corporation. On 28 January 2015, it is upgraded to Greater municipal corporation by Government of Telangana.

Smart city 

The citizens of Warangal can hope for better facilities as the Central government shortlisted it under the Smart Cities Mission. The program enables the city to secure funds from the central government in strengthening and extension of existing services and its infrastructure.

Clean Cities Championship 
In 2012, the city of Warangal was generating 300 tonnes per day (TPD) of municipal solid waste (MSW) of which about 60% was being collected by the GWMC. The residual MSW was piling up across the city, making it look untidy and creating an unsanitary environment. In these conditions, the GWMC devised an innovative solution to addressing MSW management – the Clean Cities Championship. Taking place over one week in mid October 2012, the GWMC invited waste management professionals from 57 municipalities across the state of Telangana  to compete in the Clean Cities Championship.

Leading up to the event, a multi-channel information and education campaign (IEC) created awareness and excitement about the event via billboards, posters, pamphlets, radio jingles, TV ads, street plays, a web portal and TV shows.

All the Clean Cities Championship participants were divided into 386 teams, with each team being given the responsibility of waste collection from 500 households per day. The teams went door-to-door and demonstrated correct waste segregation techniques to the householders and gave them two bins, one each for wet and dry waste. Each team spent about fours hours per day collecting MSW from households on its route. The waste was then taken to central drop-off points where it was weighed and further segregated as required. The segregated waste was then taken to waste recovery facilities, which had been prepped ahead of time, here the organic waste underwent bio-methanation or composting, the recyclable waste was sorted and recycled and the inert waste was sent to Marikonda dumpsite 15 kilometers outside the city.

National Cadet Corps (NCC) cadets were the monitors of the competition and marked the waste collection teams on attributes such as gloves worn, masks worn, etc. Each day one man and one woman from across all the teams won a prize. At the end of the week, the best team (Khammam Municipal Corporation) won the Clean Cities Championship trophy.

Following the Clean Cities Championship, Warangal became the first city in India to achieve 100% door-to-door MSW collection. About 70% of households started practicing two-bin MSW segregation into wet and dry waste. 420 cement bins and 128 dumpsters were removed from locations across Warangal making it a no dump city.

GWMC was able to reduce the MSW going to landfill by 30% to 40%  and the dumpyard with significantly reduced load is, in phases, being converted into a nature park with vermicomposting sheds.

Administration

Jurisdiction 

Greater Warangal Municipal Corporation (GWMC) Inclusion of 42 Gram Panchayats into the limits.

 Allipur
 Nakkalapally
 Ayhodhyapuram
 Tekulagudem
 Bhattupalli
 Taralapally
 Kadipikonda
 Thimmapur
 Kummarigudem
 Bheemaram
 Paidipally
 Devannapet
 Chinthagattu
 Hasanparthy
 Pegadapally
 Komatipally
 Yellapur
 Mucherla
 Mogilicherla
 Munipally
 Rampur
 Dharmaram
 Vanagapahad
 Dupakunta
 Gundlasingaram
 Gorrekunta
 Kothapeta
 Potharajpally
 Palivelpula
 Stambhampally
 Arepally
 Vasanthapur
 Enumamula
 Janpaka
 Gopalapuram
 Unikicherla
 Kothapally (H)
 Singaram
 Madikonda
 Bollikunta
 Mamunoor
 Gadepallly

Politics 
Political party performance in 2016:

List of mayors

References

External links
 Greater Warangal NEWS
 GWMC: Official Website
 GWMC: Smart city Warangal Website

Warangal
Municipal corporations in Telangana
1844 establishments in India